The Changan BenBen or sometimes Changan Benni is a 5-door city car hatchback produced by Changan Automobile.

BenBen I 

The first generation Changan BenBen was also called the BenBen i. Price starts from 34.000 yuan. In 2010, the model went through a mid cycle facelift with redesigned grilles, bumpers, tail gate, and lamps and was called the BenBen Love then.

Changan BenBen Mini 

In 2010, the original Changan BenBen was replaced by two cars, the BenBen Mini and the BenBen Love, essentially a facelifted original BenBen and will be available as a cheaper alternative next to the BenBen Mini. The prices of the BenBen Mini ranges from RMB 35,000 to 45,000 . 

Revealed on the 2011 Guangzhou Auto Show, a facelift was conducted for the Changan BenBen Mini, changing the bumper and light unit designs. 

After the discontinuation of the Changan BenBen Mini, Hawtai acquired the production licence of the hatchback and produced a rebadged electric version called the Lusheng S1 EV160B under the Lusheng passenger car series with no further styling changes done.

Changan BenBen II

The Changan BenBen II was launched on the China car market in 2014 with prices for the Changan BenBen II ranging from 47,900 yuan to 56,900 yuan. The new BenBen debuted during the 2013 Guangzhou Auto Show.

Changan BenBen EV 

Changan BenBen E-Star 
From 2020, the electric BenBen was replaced by the BenBen E-Star.

References

External links 

 

Cars introduced in 2006

2010s cars
Cars of China
Front-wheel-drive vehicles
BenBen
city cars
hatchbacks
Production electric cars